Weisburg is an unincorporated community in Jackson Township, Dearborn County, Indiana.

History
Weisburg was laid out in 1858. It was named for Philip Weis, a mill owner.

Geography

References

Unincorporated communities in Dearborn County, Indiana
Unincorporated communities in Indiana
1858 establishments in Indiana
Populated places established in 1858